Bilaspur is a census town and block headquarter in Yamunanagar District  in the state of Haryana, India. It takes its name from the corrupted form of "Vyas Puri", as it was the ashram of Ved Vyasa rishi where he wrote the Mahabharta on the banks of Sarasvati river near Adi Badri where Sarasvati river leaves Himalayas and enters the plains. On Jagadhari road lies another popular religious site of Kapal Mochan.

Demographics
 India census, Bilaspur had a population of 9620. Males constitute 53% of the population and females 47%. Bilaspur has an average literacy rate of 65%, higher than the national average of 59.5%; with male literacy of 69% and female literacy of 61%. 14% of the population is under 6 years of age.

Riverfont

Bilaspur Sarasvati Riverfont is a riverfront that is being developed. In 2021, Haryana Sarasvati Heritage Development Board initiated projects to develop 5 river fronts under the under Sarasvatio Revival Project on the rejuvenated Sarasvati river at Pipli, Pehowa, Bilaspur, Dosarka (on Panchkula-Yamunanagar NH-344 near Sirsgarh) and the Theh Polar (near Sarasvati-Sindhu Civilisation archaeological site on Kaithal-Guhla SH-11). Pipli riverfront will be on the pattern Sabarmati Riverfront.

Bilaspur is one of the important tirtha in the 48 kos parikrama of Kurukshetra.

See also

 48 kos parikrama of Kurukshetra
 Adi Badri (Haryana)
 Gita Mahotsav
 Kaushalya Dam
 Parikrama
 Lohgarh (Bilaspur)
 Morni
 Sarasvati river
 Sadaura

References

Cities and towns in Yamunanagar district
Hindu temples in Haryana
Tourism in Haryana
Tourist attractions in Haryana
Religious buildings and structures in Haryana
Mahabharata